Glauconomidae is a family of bivalves belonging to the order Venerida.

Genera:
 Glauconome Gray, 1828
 †Protovirgus McMichael, 1957
 †Unionella Etheridge, 1888

References

Venerida
Bivalve families